Into the Dark may refer to:

 Into the Dark (novel), a novel by Victor Kelleher
 Into the Dark (film), a 2012 American film
 Into the Dark (TV series), a 2018 web television series